Julie Calley is an American politician and former Second Lady from Michigan. Calley is a Republican member of Michigan House of Representatives from District 87.

Early life 
Calley's father was Ronald H. Powell (1928-2012), a farmer. Calley's mother was Margie Powell. Calley's grandfather was Stanley M. Powell, a politician and farmer in Michigan. Calley's great grandfather was Herbert Powell, a politician in Michigan.
Calley grew up on a dairy farm in Michigan.  At 16, Calley was diagnosed with eastern equine encephalitis (EEE). Calley graduated from Ionia High School.

Education 
Calley earned a bachelors degree in Business Administration and Management from Northwood University in Midland, Michigan.

Career 
Calley worked in the real estate management industry. In 1998, Calley was an office manager of The Eyde Company until 2008. Calley was a member and chair person of the Ionia County Board of Commissioners.
In 2015, Calley served as the chair person of Michigan Community Service Commission (MCSC).

On November 8, 2016, Calley won the election and became a Republican member of the Michigan House of Representatives for District 87. Calley defeated Eric Anderson and Joseph P. Gillotte with 67.08% of the votes. On November 6, 2018, as an incumbent, Calley won the election and continued serving District 87. Calley defeated Shawn Marie Winters with 67.56% of the votes.
 Calley is the chair person of Elections and Ethics Committee.

Personal life 
Calley's husband is Brian Calley, a banker and former Lieutenant Governor of Michigan, who served in the House from the 87th District from 2007 through 2010. 
In 1997, Calley moved to Portland, Michigan. They have three children, Collin, Kara and Reagan, who is autistic.

Electoral history

See also 
 2016 Michigan House of Representatives election
 2018 Michigan House of Representatives election

References

External links 
 Julie Calley at ballotpedia.org
 2019 Photo contest winners
 Brian and Julie Calley Navigating autism 2015

Republican Party members of the Michigan House of Representatives
Northwood University alumni
Living people
Women state legislators in Michigan
People from Portland, Michigan
County commissioners in Michigan
Year of birth missing (living people)
21st-century American politicians
21st-century American women politicians